Elise Nicole Archer (born 25 March 1971) is an Australian lawyer and politician who is currently the 63rd Attorney General of Tasmania. She is also Minister for Justice, Corrections, Environment and Parks and the Arts.

She was a Hobart city alderman between 2007 and 2010. She unsuccessfully stood as a Liberal Party candidate in the Division of Denison for the 2006 state election.  She polled 3.2% of the primary vote, fourth on the Liberal ticket. She stood for the same seat at the 2010 state election, polling 4.2% of the primary vote and narrowly secured the Liberal Party's second seat in Denison from preferences. After being re-elected at the 2014 state election, she was elected Speaker of the Tasmanian House of Assembly.

On 2 October 2017, Archer resigned as Speaker and was sworn in as Minister for Justice, Corrections, Environment and Parks and the Arts. 
 Archer is of Swedish descent.

References

External links
 

1971 births
Living people
Liberal Party of Australia members of the Parliament of Tasmania
Members of the Tasmanian House of Assembly
Speakers of the Tasmanian House of Assembly
Tasmanian lawyers
University of Tasmania alumni
Australian women lawyers
Australian people of Swedish descent
21st-century Australian politicians
21st-century Australian women politicians
Women members of the Tasmanian House of Assembly
Tasmanian local councillors